ASUN may refer to:
 Atlantic Sun Conference, a collegiate athletic conference in the Southeastern United States
 Protein asunder homolog or Mat89Bb, a protein encoded by the Asun gene

See also
 A Sun (film), a 2019 Taiwanese drama
 A-Sun (singer) (1975–2009), Taiwanese Mandopop singer-songwriter